Harry Stephens may refer to:

Harry E. Stephens (1857–1939), member of the Wisconsin State Assembly from 1927 to 1931
Harry J. Stephens (1866–1947), Australian journalist
Harry Stephens (actor) in Those She Left Behind
Harry Stephens (Kansas politician), member of the Kansas Senate from 1999 to 2001

See also
Harry Lushington Stephen (1860–1945), English judge
Harold Stephens (disambiguation)
Henry Stephens (disambiguation)
Harry M. Stevens (1856–1934), food concessionaire